Here We Go Again may refer to:

Film and television
Here We Go Again (film), a 1942 American comedy film
Here We Go Again (1973 TV series), an American sitcom starring Larry Hagman
Here We Go Again (2016 TV series), an American sitcom starring LaToya Luckett and Wendy Raquel Robinson
Mamma Mia! Here We Go Again, a 2018 British-American jukebox musical film sequel based on the music of ABBA

Music

Albums
Here We Go Again (Demi Lovato album) or the title song (see below), 2009
Here We Go Again (pureNRG album) or the title song, 2008
Here We Go Again (SR-71 album) or the title song, 2004
Here We Go Again!, by the Kingston Trio, 1959
Here We Go Again: Celebrating the Genius of Ray Charles, a tribute album by Willie Nelson, Wynton Marsalis, and Norah Jones, 2011
Here We Go Again, or the title song, by Joey McIntyre, 2009
Here We Go Again, by Red Steagall, 2007
Here We Go Again, an EP by the Mighty Mighty Bosstones, 1995

Songs
"Here We Go Again" (Aretha Franklin song), 1998
"Here We Go Again" (Demi Lovato song), 2009
"Here We Go Again" (Glenn Miller song), 1944
"Here We Go Again" (Governor song), 2010
"Here We Go Again" (Ray Charles song), 1967; covered by several performers
"Here We Go Again" (Sigma song), 2019
"Here We Go Again", by Danger Mouse and Jemini from Ghetto Pop Life, 2003
"Here We Go Again", by Dave Mason and Cass Elliot from Dave Mason & Cass Elliot, 1971
"Here We Go Again", by DJ Jazzy Jeff & The Fresh Prince from He's the DJ, I'm the Rapper, 1988
"Here We Go Again", by DMX from ... And Then There Was X, 1999
"Here We Go Again", by the Hives from Barely Legal, 1997
"Here We Go Again", by John Lennon from Menlove Ave., 1986
"Here We Go Again", by Laila from Hello Laila, 1998
"Here We Go Again", by Marshmello from Joytime III, 2019
"Here We Go Again", by New Found Glory from Tip of the Iceberg, 2008
"Here We Go Again", by Operation Ivy from Energy, 1989
"Here We Go Again", by Paramore from All We Know Is Falling, 2005
"Here We Go Again", by Pixie Lott from Turn It Up, 2009
"Here We Go Again!", by Portrait from Portrait, 1992
"Here We Go Again", by Sara Paxton
"Here We Go Again", by Subnoize Souljaz from Droppin Bombs, 2006
"Here We Go Again (Bump 2000)", by Kottonmouth Kings from High Society, 2000
"Here We Go Again (I Love Lake Tahoe)", by A from Monkey Kong, 1999

See also
Here We Go (disambiguation)
Here I Go Again (disambiguation)